The version of the Miraj Nameh (Mirâj Nâmeh) in the National Library of France, "supplément turc 190" is an Islamic manuscript created in the fifteenth century, in the workshops of Herat in Khorasan (modern Afghanistan), at the request of Shahrukh Mirza, son of Timur.  The text is written in Eastern Turkic language and was composed between 1436 and 1437 (840 in the Islamic calendar).

The most important text is one of many redactions of the story of The Miraculous Journey of Mohammed, which tells of the Isra and Mi'raj or night journey, including the ascension of Muhammad to heaven.  The text was composed by the poet Mir Haydar in Eastern Turkic, with calligraphy by Malik Bakhshi of Herat in the Uighur script.  The manuscript is illustrated with sixty-one Persian miniatures; like other Mi'raj manuscripts, these include depictions of Muhammad.  The Mi'raj has been described as "one of the most extraordinary of all Islamic illustrated manuscripts".

Inspiration
The work is inspired by the first verse from Sura XVII of the Koran, "al-Isra": 

The journey appears as a climb during which the angel Gabriel leads Muhammad from Mecca to the Farthest Mosque in Jerusalem, and thence to the Seventh Heaven, where they received the founder of Islam in ecstatic contemplation of the divine essence. In the first centuries of the Hejira, this story led to the creation of other popular Arabic stories and then, after theological progress, mystics and literary, were gradually integrated into Muslim belief.

Provenance
The book was bought in 1673 in Constantinople by the famous translator of The Thousand and One Nights, Antoine Galland (1646-1715).  It was taken to France, and was part of library of Jean-Baptiste Colbert.

References

Bibliography 
Nameh, Miraj: "The Miraculous Journey of Mahomet . Introduction and commentaries by Marie-Rose Séguy (1977) Ed Braziller (George) Inc., US 
Hillenbrand, Robert: Persian Painting: From the Mongols to the Qajars (Pembroke Persian Papers) Ed.   IB Tauris (2001)

External links 
Text about illustrations in Mi'raj works

Islamic illuminated manuscripts
Persian art